Babylon's Fall (バビロンズフォール) was an action role-playing game developed by PlatinumGames and published by Square Enix. The game was released for PlayStation 4, PlayStation 5, and Windows on March 3, 2022. It received generally negative reviews from critics, and was a significant commercial failure for Square Enix, with the game only reaching a concurrent player count of less than 1,200 on release day and declining sharply afterwards. Six months after the game's release, Square Enix announced that they would be ceasing support of the game's servers, which later shut down on February 27, 2023.

Gameplay
Babylon's Fall was an action role-playing hack and slash video game played from a third-person perspective. The player assumes control of a Sentinel, who must scale a massive tower known as the Ziggurat. Players started at a hub area known as Sentinel Force HQ where they can interact with other players, visit shops or blacksmiths to purchase gear and upgrades, and access quests. Each quest can be played solo, though the game also supports four-player cooperative multiplayer. Players ascend three to four floors in each quest until they reach the summit of the tower. Along the way, players will unlock loot which can be used to enhance the strength of the characters. 

Each sentinel is equipped with two weapons. However, the player is also equipped with a device known as Gideon's Coffin. The coffin allows players to carry two more spectral weapons. These weapons can no longer be used once the spectral energy bar is depleted, though it will gradually refill over time. The game features seven different weapons types, including sword, hammer, bow, rod, shield,  the great axe  and pistols. At the end of each level, players would be awarded with loot and gear. The quality of the gear depends on the player's performance in a level. Players can achieve better performance by varying their attack style, eliminating enemies quickly, and dodging attacks.

Story

The Three Story Quests 
Babylon's Fall had three story quests. The main character is a character that the player creates. The player can create any name, gender, race, etc, etc, for their main character.

1) The Liberator Quest 
Prisoners are taken on board from a ship, where following a guard, become tested out on a weapon called the Gideon Coffin. Out of the many prisoners, only 3 of them managed to survive its installation and are then promoted as Sentinels. The Gideon Coffin serves as the Sentinel's main weapon and communication device. On their first battle, they fight blue forces known as Gallu, where upon facing their first large force, a mysterious angel comes down and unlocks their Gideon Coffin, allowing them to fight. Their main goal is to stop the plague which is being caused by the Blue Sun (which is an alien deity named Nergal). Menacing bosses such as Zenon, Lord Bemus, Moira and Galenos with his giant dragon Antares stand in the way. At the end of the Liberator quest, the player created main character and another character named Arwia defeat Nergal.

2) The Resurgence (Returning Champion) Quest 
Added to the game on March 22, 2022  the story focused on the Sentinel civil war, focusing on three factions struggling to win the civil war: Sophia's Sentinels (the player created main character with Sylvie and Sophia and also Eleon of the Goat Knights and Lycus), Gallagher's The Creatures (with Gallagher, Elpis, Zogh, Lawi-Ghor and various dragons) and Urom-Baggel's Molzamites (with Urom-Baggel, Ogo-Tallwa, and some unnamed Molzamites). It ends with most of The Creatures and Molzamites being murdered by the main character as Urom-Baggel and Gallagher escape.

3) The Tale of Two Ziggurats (Another Ziggurat) Quest 
Added to the game on May 31, 2022, part of the season two update known as the Light of Auru.  While not intended to be the final quest, this third story mode serves as the conclusion to the story. The final fates of several characters are revealed as Gallagher murders Eleon, the main character murders Gallagher out of revenge, and Urom-Baggel is permanently defeated. While the plot focuses on the new Kuftaali faction who is seeking help from the player created main character to stop the new plague, the ending of the quest shows a Kuftaali character named Shamilka being revealed to be the true final boss of the game known as Ereshkigal (who is of the same alien deity race as Nergal). The game ends with the main character murdering Ereshkigal, which permanently ends the plague.

Important characters

Sophia 
Sophia is the commander of the Sentinel force (and she is also the daughter of the emperor) who ordered that the player created main character and some others be arrested and drafted into the Sentinel force against their wishes. She strongly dislikes her father (the emperor) since he is the one who ordered Urom-Baggel to spy on her. During the third and final quest of the game, it is revealed that Shamilka (who is later revealed to be the final boss known as Ereshkigal) use to come to the emperor's castle to play with Sophia when she was a little girl. Later, when speaking to Gallagher during the third and final quest, Sophia eventually feels sorry for what she has done and decides to never draft anyone again and plans to disband the Sentinel force and send everyone home after everything is over.

Sylvie 
Drafted to the Sentinel force against her wishes, she is the main Sentinel partner to the player created main character. When she is not adventuring with the player created main character, she can be found at the pub in Sentinel headquarters. She has a younger brother who she wishes she can see again. By the end of the game's third and final quest after the story has concluded and Sophia will eventually disband the Sentinel force, Sylvie hopes to practice becoming an expert when it comes to shooting pistols.

Gallagher 
Arrested and drafted into the Sentinel force during the beginning of the first quest, he and Sophia have a great amount of negativity towards each other, resulting in Sophia electrocuting Gallagher. After the fight with the first boss known as Zenon, Gallagher goes insane and goes AWOL, escaping from the Sentinel force he has been drafted into as Sophia begins to fire at Gallagher with her gun and misses as he maniacally laughs and runs away. Gallagher returns during the second quest with his own group known as The Creatures (rogue Sentinels named Elpis, Lawi-Ghor, and Zogh, accompanied with dragons) who begin a Sentinel civil war with the player created main character and others. During the third quest, after his group has been killed off, he returns and turns himself into a humanoid Dragoon and murders Eleon. After the player created main character defeats Gallagher, he transforms back to a human, apologizes for the evil he has done, and dies.

Eleon 
The leader of the Goat Knights, he was once under the command of Galenos (who is now an evil Gallu Commander for Nergal). He was once in love with a woman named Moira (who has been transformed into a large Gallu Spider like entity). He plays an important part in defeating Moira and other enemy characters with the main character throughout the three quests. After Moira is defeated, Eleon holds his former lover Moira in his arms as she turns back into a human and dies. Eleon's final fate is dying at the hands of Gallagher during the third quest. While Eleon fights valiantly and strikes Gallagher with a heavy attack, he is sadly murdered by Gallagher during the battle between them.

Lycus 
A teenage boy who has been infected by the plague being caused by the Blue Sun. He serves as Sophia's squire and is usually under the supervision of Sylvie and the main character. His father is Galenos, who has been transformed into an evil Gallu Commander. During the third and final quest, he meets a teenage girl named Aujulah (a Kuftaali girl who is in very much in love with him). After the third quest when the final story quest ends, he plans to go with Aujulah to the Kuftaali town of Waseto.

Urom-Baggel 
Appearing during the second and third quests, he is the leader of the Molzamites (who consist of a female named Ogo-Tallwa and other unnamed Molzamites), who have all been taken out of prison and drafted into the Sentinel force by Sophia. Molzamites have been known to dwell in caves formed by lava and nourish themselves with souls from fallen enemies.  He has been secretly told by the emperor to spy on Sophia. He eventually betrays Sophia and the Molzamites become the third faction in the three way civil war during the second quest. He is permanently defeated during the third quest by the main character at the beginning of the third story quest and finally when the player finds him hiding in a frozen area in one of the side mission skirmishes.

Arwia 
She is the spirit like entity who has a strong connection with the player created main character. At the near end of the first quest when the main character arrives in a dream like area, Arwia is there and states that she wishes that the player created main character would stay with her forever, but they must return and defeat Nergal. As the main character defeats Nergal, Arwia magically comes flying out and gives the final death blow to Nergal. Arwia returns at the end of the third and final quest to inform the player created main character that they are in serious danger. Arwia makes it known several times that she deeply cares about the main character. Arwia is very similar to the spirits that the player can equip to their main character in the form of "Gideon coffin voices", such as the spirit known as "Davchina the Proud" (who is a spoiled but good hearted individual who lived in ancient Babylon and was the secret daughter to the ancient Emperor of Babylon).

The Gallu, the alien deities, and other enemies. 
The two alien deities known as Nergal and Ereshkigal serve as the alien deity antagonists of Babylon's Fall. Their main goal is to destroy humans with a plague. The Gallu are evil monstrous foot soldiers, some of which use to be human. Galenos, who was once a human and was once the commander of Eleon and the father of Lycus, is transformed into a Gallu commander who rides a large dragon named Antares. Galenos, Antares, Nergal, Ereshkigal and the majority of the Gallu are murdered by the main character during the course of the game.  

Zenon was the first Sentinel of Sophia's Sentinel force and had previously saved the emperor (Sophia's father) from being poisoned. However, Zenon is eventually driven insane and is turned into a Gallu Lord. Zenon, estimated to be about 30 to 40 feet tall, is eventually murdered by the main character. Finally, a rouge Sentinel turned Gallu Lord named Lord Bemus lives in Thieves Cloister, the 2nd level of the first Ziggurat where the empire has banished people that they despise. Woman, men and children live in Thieves Cloister. After Bemus murders several civilians, he is murdered by the main character.

Imperial officers and civilians living at Sentinel headquarters 
Ishum is the 2nd in command of Sophia. He is eventually revealed to be the father of Arwia and is revealed to be from "up above". He is in charge of the crafting shop and will craft any weapons, armor, and anything else the player wants to create.

Pygmalion and Galatea are the shop owners who sell items to the player. Maminea is the owner of the Dancing Dolphin pub where Lycus works and Sylvie hangs out in. A bard named Leto would "sing" a one line "song" to the player every time a major objective was completed. Shwamina sits in the pub playing music all day. Ralimia keeps asking the main character to bring her back strange food. Many other imperial guards and civilians populate the headquarters / town.

At the end of the game, a female imperial soldier by the name of Galemia who stands across from Ishum's crafting shop, says that the main character is looking paler than usual and seems like they are drifting off into a former life they lived centuries ago. It is strongly implied that the main character had a past life centuries ago, possibly during ancient Babylon times. Meanwhile, Desran (a man who sits on the floor of the Dancing Dolphin pub) is convinced that the player created main character is really a demigod.

Finally, one of the masked imperial soldiers named Balagora explains to the main character that centuries ago, during ancient Babylon, there was an evil emperor of Babylon who had his own Sentinel force. After the Sentinels did his bidding, he started sending them off into highly dangerous quests in an effort for them to die in battle. 

Once the Sentinels of ancient Babylon caught on to what the emperor was doing, they confronted and fought the emperor and others (with one of the Sentinels breaking down every door in the Ziggurat to reach the emperor in the Pantheon garden), leading to the original Babylon's fall of centuries ago.

Special Events 
A Babylon's Fall and Nier Automata crossover event occurred in the game Babylon's Fall from March 29th, 2022 till April 26th, 2022.   The Amusement Park Rabbit from Nier Automata serves as the main boss of this crossover event.  Other special events happened during the course of Babylon's Fall, such as "The Festival of the Sun" event taking place during July 19th, 2022 till August 16th, 2022.  Serving as a short epilogue story taking place after the defeat of Ereshkigal, the "Festival of the Sun" is a large celebration being thrown. It introduces a young female Sentinel named Gaselne, who is visiting from "Sentinel Unit 2" and the highly corrupt Governor Magrabus (appointed into his position by the Emperor) who is secretly aiding the Igigi (local troll like enemies) to sabotage Sophia's Sentinels. The festival ends with the Sentinels arresting the emperor's appointed corrupt governor and with some of the characters (Sylvie, Sophia, the player created main character, etc) enjoying one last moment in the sun near the water with Sylvie proclaiming that they should all enjoy the summer with some fun in the sun. 

On 2/24/2023, Square Enix made their last reminder announcement to Babylon's Fall players that Babylon's Fall would be permanently closing down on February 27, 2023, at 11:00 p.m Pacific time (February 28th, 2023 at 2:00 a.m Eastern time).  For a few months starting November 29th, 2022 (the start of the third and final season of Babylon's Fall)  leading to the final day were a series of multiple "Season 3" special competitive events such as the Finale Boss Duels (a boss rush competition where winners would win a free "Davchina the Proud" coffin spirit voice which allowed Davchina to talk to players personally),  the Ereshkigal rankings (players would compete for points to see who would be the top ranking players against the final boss on the hardest difficulty),  and other competitive events. On the final day of Babylon's Fall, during the final minutes before the permanent server shutdown, using emotes which each player had for their player created Sentinel character for the purpose of communicating with other players,  players on the North American server gathered together to say their good byes, say their thanks to each other, and some even danced with each other till the end.

Development
Babylon's Fall was developed by PlatinumGames. According to producer Junichi Ehara, the team wanted to expand on the combat system of Nier: Automata and experiment with multiplayer with Babylon's Fall. The game's brushstroke visual art-style was inspired by classic European oil paintings, and the graphics were created using canvas-like texture. The game also borrowed assets from Final Fantasy XIV, a massively multiplayer online video game created by publisher Square Enix. The protagonist of the story was compared to a Roman gladiator by scenario writer Kenichi Iwao. The first closed beta was held in July 2021 in Japan and August 2021 in Europe and North America. The beta received a lukewarm reception, with players complaining about the game's illegible visual style. The development team evaluated players feedback and adjusted the game's graphics to ensure that they are less blurry and pixelated.

Production on the game began in 2017, around the time of Nier: Automatas release. The game was revealed at E3 2018 during Square Enix's own press conference and was originally slated to release in 2019. The first look at gameplay would be seen at Sony's December 2019 State of Play presentation. It was shown again at E3 2021, now labeled a "game as a service". This means that the game would be supported with free updates, new gameplay modes and content upon release. PlatinumGames opened a new Tokyo studio in 2020 to help the studio make live service games. The developers have stated that the game was always envisioned as a multiplayer, live service title, and expressed regret over some players having the false impression that it was a single player game because of previous footage only showing solo combat. One of the game's directors, Takahisa Sugiyama, stated that the challenge of creating an online, live-service game was "a lot harder to do than we thought". This, along with the impact of the COVID-19 pandemic and the release of new hardware, are cited as reasons for the game's lengthy delay.

The game was released on March 3, 2022, for PlayStation 4, PlayStation 5 and Windows, with cross-platform play support. Players who purchased the game's Digital Deluxe version could access the game on February 28, 2022. In September 2022, PlatinumGames and Square Enix announced that the game's servers would be shut down on February 27, 2023.

Reception 

Babylon's Fall received "generally unfavorable" reviews according to review aggregator Metacritic. Metacritic listed Babylon's Fall as the third-worst game of 2022.

Destructoid liked the combat, praising the "coffin combos" and "slick" dodges, but felt the actual structure of the game was boring; "most of the challenges are the same hallways, remixed, and the same enemies, slightly tweaked". Rock Paper Shotgun disliked the progression of the game, writing that it was needlessly confusing; "You rush through corridors and into progressively harder arenas... Occasionally there are yellow orbs to collect on your way, although I haven't been told what these do. Beat an arena and the game will give you a rank, like Stone or Bronze or Pure Platinum, which also nets you... nothing?".

On Steam, the game has an all-time high of 1,166 concurrent players, which fell to just one player in May 2022. In Japan, the physical PlayStation 4 version of Babylon’s Fall sold 2,885 copies within its first week of release, making it the twenty-fourth bestselling retail game of the week in the country. The PlayStation 5 version sold 2,224 copies in the country during the same week, making it the twenty-seventh bestselling Japan retail game throughout the week.

References

External links
 

2022 video games
Action role-playing video games
Hack and slash role-playing games
Inactive online games
High fantasy video games
Multiplayer and single-player video games
PlatinumGames games
PlayStation 4 games
PlayStation 5 games
Products and services discontinued in 2023
Square Enix games
Video games developed in Japan
Windows games